Apache Hama  is a distributed computing framework based on bulk synchronous parallel computing techniques for massive scientific computations e.g., matrix, graph and network algorithms. It was a Top Level Project under the Apache Software Foundation. Retired in April 2020, project resources are made available as part of the Apache Attic. It was created by Edward J. Yoon, who named it (short for "Hadoop Matrix") and was inspired by Google's Pregel large-scale graph computing framework described in 2010. Hama also means hippopotamus in Korean language (하마), following the trend of naming Apache projects after animals and zoology (such as Apache Pig).

Architecture 
Hama consists of three major components: BSPMaster, GroomServers and Zookeeper.

BSPMaster 
BSPMaster is responsible for:
 Maintaining groom server status
 Controlling super steps in a cluster
 Maintaining job progress information
 Scheduling jobs and assigning tasks to groom servers
 Disseminating execution class across groom servers
 Controlling fault
 Providing users with the cluster control interface.

A BSP Master and multiple grooms are started by the script. Then, the bsp master starts up with a RPC server for groom servers. Groom servers starts up with a BSPPeer instance and a RPC proxy to contact the bsp master. After started, each groom periodically sends a heartbeat message that encloses its groom server status, including maximum task capacity, unused memory, and so on.

Each time the BSP master receives a heartbeat message, it brings up-to-date groom server status - the bsp master makes use of groom servers' status in order to effectively assign tasks to idle groom servers - and returns a heartbeat response that contains assigned tasks and others actions that a groom server has to do. For now, we have a FIFO job scheduler and very simple task assignment algorithms.

GroomServer 
A groom server (shortly referred to as groom) is a process that performs BSP tasks assigned by BSPMaster. Each groom contacts the BSPMaster, and it takes assigned tasks and reports its status by means of periodical piggybacks with BSPMaster. Each groom is designed to run with HDFS or other distributed storages. Basically, a groom server and a data node should be run on one physical node.

Zookeeper 
A Zookeeper is used to manage the efficient barrier synchronisation of the BSPPeers.

See also
 
Bulk synchronous parallel
Message Passing Interface

References

External links
Apache Hama Website
Apache Hama blog

Hama
Free software programmed in Java (programming language)
Cloud computing
Cloud infrastructure